Datuk Wira Koh Nai Kwong is a Malaysian politician of the Malaysian Chinese Association (MCA), a major party in Malaysia's governing Barisan Nasional (BN) coalition. Koh was the Member of Parliament for Alor Gajah constituency, in Malacca after his election in the 2013 general election.

Koh is a lawyer by profession. He obtained his LLB (Hons) law degree from the University of Wales.

Koh was the Legal Adviser for Barisan Nasional for the state of Melaka 2006–2011. He was also the former Melaka State Executive Council (Exco) Member for the portfolio of housing, local authorities, environment and transportation.

Koh is the Chief of MCA Bukit Katil Division, Melaka. He won in the 2004 general election to be a Malacca State Legislative Assemblyman for the constituency of Kesidang, Melaka during the 2004 to 2008 term. He was later defeated by the Democratic Action Party (DAP)'s candidate Goh Leong San in the 2008 general election by a majority of 1,399 votes.

In the 2013 general election, Koh won the parliamentary seat of Alor Gajah, Melaka. In the 2018 general election, Koh was picked to contest but lost the Malacca state seat of Machap Jaya.

Election results

Honours
  :
  Companion Class I of the Order of Malacca (DMSM) – Datuk (2007)
  Knight Commander of the Order of Malacca (DCSM) - Datuk Wira (2017)

External links
 Koh Nai Kwong's Blog
 Koh Nai Kwong's Facebook

References

1961 births
Living people
People from Malacca
Malaysian politicians of Chinese descent
20th-century Malaysian lawyers
Malaysian Chinese Association politicians
Members of the Dewan Rakyat
Members of the Malacca State Legislative Assembly
Malacca state executive councillors
Members of the Dewan Negara
21st-century Malaysian politicians
Malaysian people of Teochew descent
21st-century Malaysian lawyers